Swissauto is an engine company from Burgdorf, Switzerland, best known for the V4 engine used in the, ELF, MuZ and Pulse 500cc Grand Prix motorcycles and World Championship Sidecars. It also has developed one of the most efficient (35%) internal combustion engines to extend the range of plug in hybrid electric vehicles.

Specifications

See also 

Superside
Pulse 500
ELF 500 ROC

References 

Manufacturing companies of Switzerland